Mick Gordon (born 1970) is a Northern Irish writer, film and theatre director.

Personal
Mick Gordon was born in Belfast. He graduated from Wadham College, Oxford in 1992, with a First Class Honours Degree in Modern History. He lives in Northern Ireland, with his wife Sophie Hayles and their two children.

Career
From 2012 to 2015 Gordon was Artistic Director of Aarhus Teater, Denmark. Previously he was Trevor Nunn's Associate Director at the Royal National Theatre in London and was Director of the National's Transformation Season. And Artistic Director of the Gate Theatre in London. He founded the charitable theatre company On Theatre to work in collaboration with experts from fields such as neurology, psychology, philosophy and theology. He has produced and directed over 100 theatre productions. He is the author of eight plays, and a collection of essays. His mentors are Peter Brook and the late Brian Friel.

Awards
 1996 John S Cohen Bursary Royal National Theatre Studio London UK
 1998 Critics’ Circle Most Promising Newcomer London UK
 1999 Art ACE Award Best Production Buenos Aires Argentina
 2000 Peter Brook Award for Most Outstanding Theatre UK
 2000 Closer ACE Award Best Production Buenos Aires Argentina
 2001 My Fair Lady ACE Award Best Production Buenos Aires Argentina
 2003 Betrayal Public Award Best Production Stockholm Sweden
 2005 NESTA Dreamtime Award UK
 2007 Grimms' Tales Best Production Belgrade Serbia
 2008 Deepcut Five awards Edinburgh Festival UK
 2013 Danish Reumart Award, Aarhus Theatre

Directing
 1993  Alice in Wonderland Playhouse Oxford
 1993 The Telephone European Chamber Opera Hong Kong
 1994 Cosi fan Tutte European Chamber Opera Hong Kong 
 1994 Tosca Playhouse Epsom
 1995  Rigoletto Holland Park Opera London
 1995 La Cenerentola Holland Park Opera London
 1996 La Traviata Holland Park Opera, London
 1996 The Soldiers Tale Institut Français, London 
 1996  Arabian Nights  BAC London
 1996 Renard National Youth Ballet London
 1996 The Promise Battersea Arts Centre, London 
 1997 The Tales of Hoffmann National Theatre Studio London 
 1997 Hamlet National Theatre Studio London
 1997 Measure for Measure English Touring Theatre 
 1998 Une Tempete Gate Theatre London
 1998 Volunteers Gate Theatre London
 1999 On Death (Intimate Death) Gate Theatre London
 1999 Art National Theatre Buenos Aires
 1999 Mad Dog Old Courthouse Belfast
 1999 Salome Riverside Studios, London
 1999 Marathon  Gate Theatre London
 2000 Trust Royal Court Theatre, London
 2000 Closer Teatro Nacional Cervantes, Buenos Aires
 2000 On Love Gate Theatre London
 2001 My Fair Lady Teatro Nacional Cervantes, Buenos Aires
 2001 Godspell Festival Theatre, Chichester 
 2001 The Walls National Theatre London
 2002 Monkey! Young Vic Theatre, London
 2002 Le Pub!  National Theatre London
 2002 A Prayer for Owen Meany National Theatre London 
 2003 Betrayal Strindbergs Intima Teater, Stockholm
 2004 The Real Thing Strindbergs Intima Teater Stockholm
 2005 A Play in Swedish English and Italian Royal Dramatic Theatre, Stockholm
 2005 On Ego Soho Theatre London
 2006 War Strindbergs Intima Teater, Stockholm
 2006 Winners, Losers Strindbergs Intima Teater, Stockholm
 2006 Optic Trilogy Royal Dramatic Theatre, Stockholm
 2006 On Religion (Grace) Soho Theatre London
 2007 Grimms' Tales Dusko Radovic Belgrade
 2008 On Emotion  Soho Theatre London
 2008 Dancing at Lughnasa Lyric Theatre Belfast
 2009 The Home Place Grand Opera House, Belfast An Granian Theatre Letterkenny
 2009 The Ride of Your Life Polka Theatre, London
 2009 Deep Cut Tricycle Theatre, London, Sherman Theatre, Cardiff, Traverse Theatre, Edinburgh
 2010 The Tempest OSC/Wadham College 400th Anniversary
 2010 Translations Curve Theatre Leicester
 2010 Bea Soho Theatre, London
 2011 Sweeney Todd Aarhus Theatre, Denmark
 2011 Both Sides Belfast International Theatre Festival
 2012 Uncle Vanya  Lyric Theatre (Belfast)
 2012 Ghosts Aarhus Theatre 
 2013 Dancing at Lughnasa Aarhus Theatre 
 2014 The Visit Aarhus Theatre 
 2015 On/Off Aarhus Theatre 
 2016 Door into the Dark Seamus Heaney Home Place 
 2017 Sinners Lyric Theatre (Belfast)
 2017 Making History FrielFest 
 2018 The Music Room BBC NI 
 2018 Living Quarters FrielFest 
 2019 A Deal's a Deal RTE Storylands

Writing
 2005 On Ego Oberon Books
 2005 On Love Oberon Books
 2005 On Death (Intimate Death) Oberon Books
 2006 On Religion (Grace) Oberon Books
 2007 Conversations on Religion Continuum Books
 2008 On Emotion Oberon Books
 2009 The Ride of Your Life Oberon Books
 2009 Identity and Identification Black Dog Publishing
 2009 Conversations on Truth Continuum Books
 2010 Pressure Drop Oberon Books
 2010 Theatre and the Mind Oberon Books
 2011 Bea Oberon Books
 2015 ON/OFF Aarhus Teater 
 2019 Hvad med teaterhistorien? (What about Theatre History?) Contributor

References

External links
 Unitedagents.co.uk
 Aarhusteater.dk
 Politiken.dk
 Havebackstage.dk
 Guardian.co.uk
 Independent.co.uk
 Thestage.co.uk
 Guardian.co.uk
 Oberonbooks.com
 Guardian.co.uk
 Telegraph.co.uk
 Artandmind.org
 Whatsonstage.com
 Wellcome.ac.uk
 Malopozoriste.co.rs

Male dramatists and playwrights from Northern Ireland
People from Belfast
Artistic directors from Northern Ireland
British theatre directors
British essayists
1970 births
Living people
Alumni of Wadham College, Oxford